Radovan Vích (born 25 December 1964) is a Czech politician and an MP in the Chamber of Deputies for the Freedom and Direct Democracy party since 2017.

Vích graduated from the University of Defence in Brno and worked as an engineer in the Czech army and has been an army reservist since 2010. In 2015, he became a founding member of the Freedom and Direct Democracy (SPD) in Liberec and became the party spokesman on matters related to defense. In the 2017 Czech legislative election, he was elected to the Chamber of Deputies for the Liberec region.

References

External link

1964 births
Living people
21st-century Czech politicians
Freedom and Direct Democracy MPs
Members of the Chamber of Deputies of the Czech Republic (2017–2021)
Members of the Chamber of Deputies of the Czech Republic (2021–2025)